Centenary Institute is a medical research centre in Sydney, Australia.

Centenary Institute may also refer to:

 Centenary Institute (Alabama), former college in Summerfield, Alabama
 Morgan State University, formerly the Centenary Biblical Institute

See also
Centenary College (disambiguation)
Centenary University